Eddy DeMello was a popular Bermudian entrepreneur, businessman, music promoter, record label owner and record producer. He has also made a notable contribution to the garage rock genre.

Background
He was born Manuel Edward DeMello on November 10, 1937, in São Miguel Island, Azores, Portugal. He came to Bermuda in September 1949.
As well as a prominent businessman, he has been described as an entertainment impresario, and longtime champion of Bermuda's Portuguese community.  His involvement in the music business included being a record store owner and record production. He was one Bermuda's most successful concert promoters. His store was the Music Box on Reid Street.

For seventeen years he was president of the Vasco da Gama Club. For his work and contribution to Bermuda's music and art he was awarded the Bermuda Arts Council's Lifetime Achievement in 2004.

Record labels and production
Starting in the 1960s, he produced many recordings that appeared his Duane and Edmar record labels. One album was Live 'n Wild by The Savages which is now considered a garage rock collectors piece. Other artists he produced were The Gents with their garage punk classic, "If You Don’t Come Back".  Other groups include The Weads, The Bermuda Strollers and The Klan. He also designed and provided the liner notes for the Beautiful Bermuda album by The Merrymen. Duane is the name of DeMello's son.

Duane Records
Artists to have releases on his Duane label include Bishop Kane, The Savages, Silvertones, and The Weads.

Promotion
DeMello brought The Merrymen to Bermuda where they spent six weeks. This resulted in a friendship between him and the group which lasted for years. Among the artists that DeMello was instrumental in bringing to Bermuda were Ray Charles, Stevie Wonder and Amalia Rodrigues.

Death
Following a long illness, DeMello died on March 6, 2013, at the age of 75.

References

External links
 Bernews: Beloved Impresario Eddy DeMello Dies At 75
 Bermuda Bios: Manuel Edward “Eddy” DeMello
 Discogs Edmar label
 Discogs Edmar Records label
 Discogs: Eddy De Mello Productions

1937 births
2013 deaths
Portuguese emigrants to Bermuda
Bermudian businesspeople